El Guacamayo is a town and municipality in the Santander Department in northeastern Colombia.

Climate
El Guacamayo has a subtropical highland climate (Köppen Cfb) with warm afternoons, cool to comfortable mornings, and very heavy rainfall year-round.

References

Municipalities of Santander Department